The Woodward cis-hydroxylation (also known as the Woodward reaction) is the chemical reaction of alkenes with iodine and silver acetate in wet acetic acid to form cis-diols.(conversion of olefin into cis-diol)

The reaction is named after its discoverer, Robert Burns Woodward.

This reaction has found application in steroid synthesis.

Reaction mechanism
The reaction of the iodine with the alkene is promoted by the silver acetate, thus forming an iodinium ion (3).  The iodinium ion is opened via SN2 reaction by acetic acid (or silver acetate) to give the first intermediate, the iodo-acetate (4).  Through anchimeric assistance, the iodine is displaced via another SN2 reaction to give an oxonium ion (5), which is subsequently hydrolyzed to give the mono-ester (6).

References

See also
 Prévost reaction

Organic oxidation reactions
Substitution reactions
Name reactions